Joe Cowell (born 6 January 2002) is a Welsh rugby union player, currently playing for United Rugby Championship side Cardiff. His preferred position is prop.

Cardiff
Cowell was called into Cardiff's European squad ahead of their European campaign. He made his debut for Cardiff in the first round of the 2021–22 European Rugby Champions Cup against  coming on as a replacement.

References

2002 births
Living people
Welsh rugby union players
Cardiff Rugby players
Rugby union props